Muminul Islam (born 1 January 1997) is a Bangladeshi cricketer. He made his first-class debut for Sylhet Division in the 2018–19 National Cricket League on 29 October 2018.

References

External links
 

1997 births
Living people
Bangladeshi cricketers
Sylhet Division cricketers
Place of birth missing (living people)